Pietro Farina (7 May 1942 − 24 September 2013) was an Italian Roman Catholic bishop.

Ordained to the priesthood in 1966, Farina was named bishop of the Diocese of Alife-Caiazzo, Italy, in 1999 and then Bishop of the Diocese of Caserta in 2009 where he died in office.

References

1942 births
2013 deaths
Bishops in Campania